NJPW Strong is a professional wrestling television series produced by Japanese professional wrestling promotion New Japan Pro-Wrestling (NJPW) which debuted on August 7, 2020. It  aired on Saturday at 8pm ET on NJPW World and FITE TV.

History
On November 24, 2014, AXS TV announced that it had acquired a thirteen-episode series featuring matches from New Japan Pro Wrestling under the AXS TV Fights banner. The series was an English-language adaptation of NJPW's own television series, NJPW World Pro Wrestling, produced by TV Asahi. The series premiered on January 16, 2015, airing on Friday evenings. This was the first time NJPW had been aired on an American television network since its formation in 1972. NJPW content would continue to air on AXS until December 2019. Prior to this, on October 21, NJPW announced the formation of an American subsidiary called "New Japan Pro-Wrestling of America".

On July 31, 2020, NJPW announced a new weekly series titled NJPW Strong, with its initial episodes to feature matches from the inaugural New Japan Cup USA tournament. As part of NJPW's expansion into the United States, the series would be produced by NJPW of America.

The premiere episode of Strong aired on August 7, 2020, broadcast live from NJPW's training dojo in Los Angeles, and streaming on NJPW's service NJPW World. The event was held with no spectators due to the COVID-19 pandemic. On August 19, NJPW announced that Strong would be streaming on FITE TV in conjunction with NJPW World.

On January 6, 2023 Hiroshi Tanahashi announced on his blog that the January tapings would be the last, and that 'overseas tournaments' would be announced in a different form in the future.

Special episodes

Roster

The wrestlers featured on Strong take part in scripted feuds and storylines. Wrestlers are portrayed as heroes, villains, or less distinguishable characters in scripted events that build tension and culminate in a wrestling match.

Commentators

Ring announcers

See also
 List of professional wrestling television series
 2020 in professional wrestling

References

External links
Official New Japan Pro-Wrestling Japanese website
Official New Japan Pro-Wrestling English website

2020s American television series
2020s Japanese television series
2020 American television series debuts
2020 Japanese television series debuts
New Japan Pro-Wrestling
American live television series
American professional wrestling television series